The Vauxhall Cadet VY is an automobile produced by Vauxhall from 1930 until 1933. It was an entirely new model announced by Vauxhall on 6 October 1930. The first Vauxhall priced below £300, it was intended to supplement the existing 24 h.p. 20-60 thereafter to be known as the Vauxhall Eighty. When exported it was usually supplied with a 27 h.p. engine and named VX. The first truly new Vauxhall since General Motors' purchase of the business in 1925, it was an American-style car with certain local amendments.

The mascot on the Cadet's radiator cap became the (two-dimensional) BOAC Speedbird logo.

Synchromesh gearbox
The first British car fitted with a gear-box "embodying the now famous Synchro-Mesh principle", a system of gear change making every driver an expert. Providing a faultless shift-speed operation it was fitted to all Cadets from late 1931.

Body
The front seats are easily moveable. There is a ventilator in the scuttle. The rear-most glasses of the six side windows are fixed while the middle ones can be wound down more than half-way and the forward ones fully. The one-piece windscreen opens out fully. The spare wheel and tyre are in a well in the nearside front wing, tools in a locked cupboard under the bonnet. The metal panelled saloon can be had in three colours.

Pricing
Vauxhall Cadet standard saloon £280—or with sliding roof and protectoglass, £298
Two-seater, £295
Sports coupé, £298
Four-light coupé, £298

1933
For 1933 detailed refinements were made to provide more comfort and better appearance, "the bodies are more imposing and the cars look lower". Bonnet flutes, lamps and bumpers were chromium-plated. The saloon's rear seats were deeper and finer quality leather upholstery provided. An eddy-free roof front, anti-glare sloping windscreen and anti-dazzle dipping headlamps were fitted, and dual electric screenwipers replaced the single vacuum instrument.

4-door saloon with flush-type weatherproof sliding roof, £295
Grosvenor saloon de luxe £325
Tickford all-weather saloon, £335
Fixed-head coupé (2 or 4-light), £295
Romney 2-seater drop-head coupé, £325
Denton 4-seater drop-head coupé, £335
all prices ex Works

"The Tickford model is a double purpose car, as the head can quickly and easily be wound down, and the windows lowered to make what is practically an open car. The windows can also be used up with the head back to avoid draughts or too much air. This Salmons body has stood the test of time in regard to utility and durability." The Times

Engine
The 17 h.p. six-cylinder engine's overhead valves are operated by pushrods, the unit itself being suspended on rubber at four points damping out all vibration in top gear. The carburettor has interconnected choke and throttle controls ensuring immediate starting from cold. The radiator is in a shell with a stone guard. There is no thermostatic control within the engine cooling system. The three branch inlet manifold is on the near or left side of the engine above the four-branched square-sectioned exhaust manifold. Timing is by duplex roller chain. The crankshaft runs in four bearings.

A 26.3 h.p. engine is provided for export in a model named VX.

Better carburation was provided for 1933, which gave improved acceleration and better fuel consumption.

Chassis
Steering is by cam and lever. Rear suspension is by half-elliptical, and practically flat, springs mounted beneath the axle and on rubber pads. Front springs are splayed. Single-acting hydraulic shock absorbers are employed in front and back.  Bumpers are supplied fore and aft and there is a folding luggage grid.

Brakes are on all four wheels, they are half servo type and have part rods and part cables in front and cables behind. Rods are used for the handbrake.

Smaller wheels with larger tyres, heavier bumpers, smoother springing, improved shock absorbers were all improvements listed for 1933.

Performance
The motoring correspondent of The Times described the engine as having an almost turbine-like silence and smoothness with beautifully responsive acceleration. Flexibility was demonstrated by "the ability to flash away from 3 m.p.h. in top gear into express train speed in a few seconds without the least suspicion of transmission jerk". Reportedly in the teeth of a high wind maximum speed was 65 m.p.h. Petrol consumption was good, about 23 mp.pg. and oil consumption about 900 m.p.g.

"At its price this car provides luxury motoring in the very best sense and within the reach of people of moderate means."

References

External links

 Vauxhall Cadet brochure from the Bodleian Library

Cadet
Cars introduced in 1932
1930s cars
Rear-wheel-drive vehicles
Sedans